St. Francis Cathedral may refer to:

 St. Francis Xavier Cathedral (disambiguation)
 Cathedral of St. Francis de Sales (disambiguation)
 Saint Francis of Assisi Cathedral (disambiguation)

See also
 St. Francis Church (disambiguation)